Changqingqiao is a railway station on the Xi'an–Pingliang railway. It is one of the three major railway stations in Qingyang City, especially as a freight station. Freight and passenger service started in 2015 The station is served by passenger service several times a day as a terminus of routes to Pingliang railway station of Pingliang City and Lanzhou railway station.

References 

Railway stations in Gansu
Railway stations in China opened in 2015